"Wiener Blut" is a song by Austrian singer and musician Falco, released as a single from his 1988 studio album Wiener Blut. It reached no. 4 in Austria, no. 9 in West Germany and no. 24 in Switzerland. The song is credited to Falco, Rob Bolland and Ferdi Bolland. It was produced by Rob and Ferdi Bolland.

Critical reception 
Pan-European magazine Music & Media wrote, "Possibly the best since Rock Me Amadeus: big beats, hectic instrumentation and an irresistible chorus. Cool."

Track listings 
 7" single GIG 111 207 (1988, Austria)
 7" single Teldec 247 743-7 (1988, West Germany)
 "Wiener Blut" (3:31)
 "Tricks" (3:52)
 		 	 
 3" CD single Teldec 247 741-2 (West Germany, 1988)
 "Wiener Blut" (7:20)
 "Tricks" (3:52)
 "Sand am Himalaya" (4:00)
 		 	 
 12" maxi single Teldec 247 742-0 (West Germany, 1988)
 "Wiener Blut" (7:20)
 "Tricks" (3:52)

Charts

References

External links 

 Falco – "Wiener Blut" at Discogs

1988 songs
1988 singles
Falco (musician) songs
Teldec singles
Songs written by Falco (musician)
Songs written by Ferdi Bolland
Songs written by Rob Bolland